
This is a list of golfers who graduated from the Korn Ferry Tour and Korn Ferry Tour Finals in 2021. Due to the COVID-19 pandemic, there was no graduating class in 2020, and the 2020 Korn Ferry Tour season extended into 2021. The top 25 players on the 2020–21 Korn Ferry Tour regular-season points list earned PGA Tour cards for 2021–22. The Finals determined the other 25 players to earn PGA Tour cards and the initial priority order of all 50.

As in previous seasons, the Finals featured the top 75 players on the Korn Ferry Tour regular season points list, players ranked 126–200 on the PGA Tour's regular-season FedEx Cup points list (except players exempt through other means), non-members of the PGA Tour with enough regular-season FedEx Cup points to place 126–200, and special medical exemptions. Since the Finals were not held in 2020, PGA Tour players who finished outside the top 200 of the FedEx Cup in 2021 but inside the top 200 in 2020 are eligible to compete; non-members who earned enough points in 2020 to equal 200th place in 2021 were also eligible.

To determine the initial 2021–22 PGA Tour priority rank, the 25 Korn Ferry Tour regular-season graduates were alternated with the 25 Finals graduates. This priority order was then reshuffled several times during the 2021–22 season based on the FedEx Cup standings.

Stephan Jäger and Joseph Bramlett were fully exempt for the 2021–22 PGA Tour season after leading the full-season and Finals points lists, respectively. Mito Pereira was also fully exempt due to winning three times during the Korn Ferry Tour season, as was Will Zalatoris due to FedEx Cup points earned as a non-member in the 2021 PGA Tour season.

2021 Korn Ferry Tour Finals

*PGA Tour rookie in 2021–22
†First-time PGA Tour member in 2021–22, but ineligible for rookie status due to having played eight or more PGA Tour events as a professional in a previous season
#Received a three-win promotion to the PGA Tour during 2020–21 season
 Earned spot in Finals through PGA Tour.
 Earned spot in Finals through FedEx Cup points earned as a PGA Tour non-member.
 Earned spot in Finals through a medical extension.
 Indicates whether the player earned his card through the regular season or through the Finals.

Results on 2021–22 PGA Tour 

*PGA Tour rookie in 2022
†First-time PGA Tour member in 2022, but ineligible for rookie status due to having played eight or more PGA Tour events in a previous season
 Retained his PGA Tour card for 2023: won or finished in the top 125 of the adjusted FedEx Cup points list.
 Retained PGA Tour conditional status and qualified for the Web.com Tour Finals: finished between 126–150 on the adjusted FedEx Cup list.
 Failed to retain his PGA Tour card for 2023 but qualified for the Web.com Tour Finals: finished between 150–200 on the adjusted FedEx Cup list through the Finals entry deadline.
 Failed to retain his PGA Tour card for 2023 and to qualify for the Web.com Tour Finals: was outside the top 200 on the adjusted FedEx Cup list at the Finals entry deadline.

For the purposes of determining eligibility, the FedEx Cup standings were adjusted to remove all players who were suspended for participating in LIV Golf (and had not resigned PGA Tour membership), including Uihlein. No adjusted money list was released.

Nick Hardy, Michael Gligic, Austin Cook, and Joseph Bramlett regained their cards through the 2022 Korn Ferry Tour Finals.

Wins on the PGA Tour in 2021–22

Runner-up finishes on the PGA Tour in 2021–22

References

External links
Korn Ferry Tour official site

Korn Ferry Tour
PGA Tour
Korn Ferry Tour Finals graduates
Korn Ferry Tour Finals graduates
Korn Ferry Tour Finals graduates